Ajo School District 15 And 103 is a public school district in Pima County, Arizona, United States.

External links
 

School districts in Pima County, Arizona